P78 or P-78 may refer to:

 FB P-78, a pistol
 , a submarine of the Royal Navy
 , a corvette of the Indian Navy
 North American XP-78, a variant of the North American P-51 Mustang
 P78 road (Ukraine)
 Papyrus 78, a biblical manuscript
 Solwind, a NASA space probe
 P78, a state regional road in Latvia
 HS Karathanasis (P 78), a Roussen-class fast attack craft of the Hellenic Navy
 RSS Sea Dragon (P78), a missile gunboat of the Republic of Singapore Navy